Dominique Kabasu Babo (born 4 March 1950) is a Congolese football defender who played for Zaire in the 1974 FIFA World Cup. He also played for AS Dragons.

Babo died on 30th January 2022, tributes were made by Tresor Lualua via Instagram.

References

External links
FIFA profile

1950 births
Living people
Democratic Republic of the Congo footballers
Democratic Republic of the Congo international footballers
Association football defenders
1974 FIFA World Cup players
1976 African Cup of Nations players
AS Dragons players
21st-century Democratic Republic of the Congo people